Inna is a river that flows through the municipality of Verdal in Trøndelag county, Norway.  The river begins in the east at the lake Innsvatnet, located near the border to Sweden, and it runs west to the village of Vuku at the confluence of the rivers Inna and Helgåa, which together become the river Verdalselva.  The river Inna runs through the Inndalen valley, through the villages of Sul, Garnes, Holmen, and ends at Vuku.

See also
List of rivers in Norway

References

Verdal
Rivers of Trøndelag
Rivers of Norway